Archeological Site 38CK44, also known as Locus 1, is a historic archaeological site located near Gaffney, Cherokee County, South Carolina.  The site contains well preserved examples of a specialized soapstone procurement site occupied primarily during the prehistoric, Late Archaic Period (3000 BC – 500 BC).

It was listed in the National Register of Historic Places in 1980.

See also
Pacolet Soapstone Quarries

References

Archaeological sites on the National Register of Historic Places in South Carolina
National Register of Historic Places in Cherokee County, South Carolina